The fort of Planoise is a fortification located on the summit of the hill of Planoise, in Besançon (Franche-Comté, France). Although its location was extremely strategic, the fort was not used during either the first or the second World War.

History 
The monument was built in 1877 to 1882, on the summit of the hill of Planoise (at 490m), to defend the city of Besançon. In the 1930s the fort was abandoned, and in 1949 Emmaus homeless charity rented the Planoise fort for offices.

Gallery

See also 
 Fort

References

Buildings and structures in Besançon
Planoise
Planoise